Ottilie is a given name for women. The name is a French derivative of the medieval German masculine name Otto, and has the meaning "prosperous in battle", "riches", "prosperous" or "wealth".

Popularity
The name has increased in popularity in England and Wales in recent years. It has ranked among the top 500 names for girls in those countries since 2015 and was the 118th most popular name for girls there in 2021. It is a name that has been particularly well-used for girls from upper class British families. The traditional German pronunciation is o-TEE-lee-ə. The usual British pronunciation is OT-i-lee. Its popularity in the United States peaked in 1880 when it reached almost 600th position. It is now an unfamiliar name to many Americans, but is also increasing in usage in the United States, where the name was given to 25 newborn girls in 2021.  

Ottilie is a variant of Odile. Ottilia, Ottiliana, and Ottoline are variants of Ottilie.

People
Ottilie Abrahams, Namibian activist
Ottilie Assing, German journalist
Ottilie von Bistram, Latvian writer and teacher
Ottilia Borbáth, Romanian actor
Ottilie Davidová, the youngest of Franz Kafka's three sisters
Ottilie Fleischer, German athlete
Ottilie Louise Fresco, Dutch scientist
Otti Geschka, full name Ottilie Geschka (born 1939), German pediatric nurse and politician
Ottilie Godefroy, Austrian actor who performed under the name Tilla Durieux
Ottilie von Hansemann, German women's rights activist
Ottilie Houser Brattain, American mathematician and mother of the physicist Walter Houser Brattain.
Ottilie Hoffmann, German educationalist and social reformer
Ottilie of Katzenelnbogen, German aristocrat
Tillie Klimek,  American serial killer
Ottilie Kruger,  American actor and daughter of the actor Otto Kruger
Ottilia Carolina Kuhlman, Swedish actor
Ottoline Leyser, British plant biologist
Ottilie A. Liljencrantz, American writer
Ottilia Littmarck, Swedish actor and director
Tilly Losch, Austrian dancer and choreographer
Ottalie Mark, Russian-American musicologist
Ottilie Maclaren Wallace, Scottish sculptor
Ottilie Metzger, German contralto
Lady Ottoline Morrell, English society hostess
Ottilie Mulzet, translator of Hungarian poetry and prose
Ottilie Palm Jost, Canadian impressionist artist
Ottilie Patterson, Northern Irish jazz singer
Ottilie Roederstein, Swiss painter
Ottilie Stibaner, German chess player
Ottilie Sutro, American pianist
Ottilie Tolansky (1912–1977), Austrian artist
Ottilie Turnbull Seybolt (1889–1978), American theatre professor
Ottilie Wildermuth, German writer
Otylia Jędrzejczak, Polish swimmer

Fictional characters
Ottilie, a principal character in the novel Elective Affinities by Johann Wolfgang von Goethe
Ottilie Harshom, protagonist in John Wyndham‘s story "Random Quest", published in 1961 and later made into the film Quest for Love
Ottilie, in "To Ottilie" by Robert Louis Stevenson
Ottilie, in the short story "House of Flowers" by Truman Capote, later adapted into a musical of the same name

References 

English given names